The Autobianchi Bianchina is a minicar produced by the Italian automaker Autobianchi, based on the Fiat 500. It was available in various configurations: Berlina (saloon), Cabriolet (roadster), Trasformabile (fixed profile convertible), Panoramica (station wagon), and Furgoncino (van). The car was presented to the public on 16 September 1957 at the Museum of Science and Technology in Milan.

Initially, the car was equipped with the smallest Fiat engine, air-cooled 479 cc, producing .

This body style featured a fixed B-pillar and partial roof, like the rest of the opening was covered with a foldable fabric hood, while the Cabriolet version had no B-pillar. The Trasformabile was the only version to feature suicide doors, and in 1962, it was replaced by a four-seat saloon. The engine and chassis were the same in both.

In 1965, a minor facelift was made. In France, the models were sold under different names: the Berlina became the Lutèce, the Familiare the Texane, and the Cabriolet was marketed as the Eden Roc.

Production

The Bianchina was produced from 1957 to 1970, for a total volume of approximately 275,000. 

Source: Club Bianchina and Bianchina Classic Club

Autobianchi Bianchina Giardiniera
Autobianchi also used the Bianchina name for the Autobianchi Bianchina Giardiniera.

In popular culture 
The 1966 movie How to Steal a Million with Audrey Hepburn and Peter O'Toole features Hepburn's character driving a red Autobianchi Bianchina cabriolet.

Italian comedy character Ugo Fantozzi, created by Paolo Villaggio and protagonist of television monologues, short stories, and films, famously drives a white Bianchina, usually somewhat damaged and with a four-leaf clover decal on the left side. The car is known for its tendency to become badly damaged throughout these stories.

In the animation film Despicable Me 2, the car of Lucy Wilde resembles a Bianchina Trasformabile.

References

External links
 Registro Autobianchi
 Bianchina Club at web.archive.org
 Bianchina Classic Club (Italian only)
  ( Autobianchi Bianchina Furgoncino)

Bianchina
1960s cars
1970s cars
Cars introduced in 1957
Rear-engined vehicles
Station wagons